Damain Doubler (born 1989) is a Welsh international lawn and indoor bowler.

Bowls career
In 2017, he reached the final of the open pairs during the 2017 World Indoor Bowls Championship with his playing partner Daniel Salmon

Outdoors, Doubler won his first National title in 2021 after winning the men's fours title at the 2021 Welsh National Bowls Championships, bowling for Penylan BC. He had previously finished runner-up in the same event during the 2017 Championships.

References

Living people
Welsh male bowls players
1989 births